Aglossa exsucealis is a species of snout moth in the genus Aglossa. It was described by Julius Lederer in 1863 from Beirut, Lebanon. It is also found on Cyprus.

Subspecies
Aglossa exsucealis exsucealis
Aglossa exsucealis ommatalis (Hampson, 1906) (Cyprus)

References

Moths described in 1863
Pyralini
Moths of Europe